Four Seasons Hotel and Tower may refer to:

Four Seasons Hotel Denver in Denver, Colorado, United States
Four Seasons Hotel Hong Kong in Hong Kong, People's Republic of China
Four Seasons Hotel Miami in Miami, Florida, United States
Four Seasons Hotel Toronto in Toronto, Ontario, Canada

See also
Four Seasons Hotels and Resorts
Four Seasons Hotel and Residences

Four Seasons hotels and resorts